Machine II Machine: Electric Club Mixes is an EP by German hard rock singer Doro Pesch, containing remixes of some songs of her previous album Machine II Machine and the unpublished song "Emotional Suicide". The remixes were done by Greg Smith and by members of the German industrial metal band Die Krupps. This is the last Doro work published by the Polygram/Vertigo label.

Track listing
"The Want (Single Edit)" (Doro Pesch, Jack Ponti, Camus Celli, Andres Levin) – 4:05
"Machine II Machine (Electric Mix)" (Pesch, Ponti, Greg Smith) – 5:26
remix by Greg Smith
"Ceremony (Krupps Mix)" (Pesch, Ponti, Celli, Levin) – 5:05
remix by Die Krupps
"Tie Me Up (Hard & Fast Mix)" (Pesch, Ponti, Smith) – 5:14
remix by Greg Smith
"The Want (Give It Up Mix)" (Pesch, Ponti, Celli, Levin) – 6:48
remix by Greg Smith
"Ceremony (Metal Hammer Mix)" (Pesch, Ponti, Celli, Levin)- 3:56
remix by Greg Smith
"Machine II Machine (Big Phat Mix)" (Pesch, Ponti, Smith) – 5:26
remix by Greg Smith
"The Want (5 A.M. Mix)" (Pesch, Ponti, Celli, Levin) – 5:40
remix by Greg Smith
"Emotional Suicide (Cave Man Mix)" (Pesch, Ponti, Smith) – 4:29
remix by Greg Smith

References

Doro (musician) EPs
1995 EPs
1995 remix albums
Remix EPs
Vertigo Records remix albums
Vertigo Records EPs